The 'Graham' mango is a named mango cultivar which originated in Trinidad.

History 
Graham was a seedling of the Julie mango planted in Trinidad. In 1932 the variety was introduced to the United States by the USDA through Florida.

Graham has become a popular nursery stock tree in Florida for home growing due to its fine flavor and good disease resistance. It was selected as a curator's choice mango for Fairchild Tropical Botanic Garden's 2008 mango festival. The fruit is also popular in the Windward Islands.

Graham trees are now planted in the USDA's germplasm repository in Miami, Florida., the University of Florida's Tropical Research and Education Center in Homestead, Florida, and the Miami-Dade Fruit and Spice Park, also in Homestead.

Description 

The fruit is of oval shape, with a rounded apex that sometimes contains a small lateral beak. The skin is yellow at maturity, and is bumpy and undulating. The flesh is orange, fiberless, and has a rich and aromatic flavor with a resinous note. The fruit contains a monoembryonic seed, and typically matures from June to August in Florida.

Unlike its parent 'Julie', Graham is a vigorous grower that reaches over 20 feet in height and forms a round, dense canopy.

References

See also 
  Video description of Graham by Dr. Jonathan Crane of the University of Florida's Tropical Research and Education Center

Mango cultivars
Flora of Trinidad and Tobago